Boat to Bolivia is the debut album from Martin Stephenson and the Daintees.

Track listing
All songs written and composed by Martin Stephenson.
 "Crocodile Cryer" – 4:43
 "Coleen" – 3:41
 "Little Red Bottle" – 4:08
 "Running Water" – 3:09
 "Tribute to the Late Reverend Gary Davis" – 1:18
 "Candle in the Middle" – 3:25
 "Piece of the Cake" – 2:56
 "Look Down Look Down" – 2:54
 "Slow Lovin'" – 4:01
 "Caroline" – 3:16
 "Rain" – 4:02
 "Boat to Bolivia" – 4:02 (this track was added to the 1987 version due to "popular demand")

Personnel
Martin Stephenson – Lead vocals, guitars
Anthony Dunn – Bass, double bass, acoustic guitar, backing vocals 
Claire Dunn – Backing vocals
Paul Smith – Percussion
John Steel - Guitar, harmonica, organ, piano, backing vocals

References

1986 debut albums
Martin Stephenson and the Daintees albums